Shane O'Grady (born 1 May 1970) is an Australian former professional rugby league footballer who played in the 1990s. He played for the Balmain Tigers from 1991 to 1992, the Penrith Panthers in 1993 and finally the Newcastle Knights in 1999.

References

External links
http://www.rugbyleagueproject.org/players/Shane_O-Grady/summary.html

1970 births
Living people
Australian rugby league players
Balmain Tigers players
Penrith Panthers players
Newcastle Knights players
Rugby league players from Sydney
Rugby league props
Rugby league second-rows